Eucosma saussureana is a moth of the family Tortricidae. It is endemic to Fennoscandia.

The wingspan is 18–20 mm. Adults are on wing from June to July.

The larvae feed on Saussurea alpina.

External links
 Fauna Europaea

Eucosmini
Moths of Europe
Moths described in 1928